The Pacific Coast Engineering Company or PACECO is an American industrial fabricator and mechanical engineering company, and was previously a shipbuilding company in Oakland, California and then Alameda, California. To support the World War II demand for ships, PACECO shipyard switched over to military construction and built US Navy Tugboats.

As early as February of 1920, PACECO was reported to be bidding on a contract to make alterations or improvements to a Japanese steamer in Seattle. Started as a mechanical engineering company, PACECO began operations in its Oakland shipyard in 1922. The Oakland shipyard at the 14th Street terminus (Oakland Outer Harbor) was acquired by the US. Navy in 1940 for World War II needs. PACECO moved the shipyard to 350 Blanding Avenue, Alameda. The new yard did prefab sub assemblies for the other Bay Area shipyards, like the Richmond Shipyards. In 1943, PACECO built its first of five US Navy tugboats.

After the war, PACECO built tugboats, barges, and container cranes. The first quayside container gantry crane was developed by PACECO in 1959. PACECO was sold to Fruehauf Trailer Corporation in 1967. Fruehauf ended shipbuilding in 1976 and changed to build primarily container crane and container chassis. The Alameda shipyard was on the south side of the Tidal Canal, just west of the Park Street Bridge on the Oakland Estuary in the San Francisco Bay Area. , the site was a vacant lot.

Ships
Notable ships:
Baylander (IX-514): United States Navy Helicopter Landing Trainer laid down by PACECO on December 28, 1967 as Yard No. 238, in Alameda.
 Alki Fire Boat
 Snoqualmie (fireboat)
 Five Woban Class District Harbor Tug: Mawkaw (YT 182), Negwagon (YT 188), Nepanet (YT 189), Orono (YT 190) and Osamekin (YT 191). Each with a displacement of 237 tons, a length of 100 feet, a beam 28 feet, a draft 9 feet. Top speed 12 kts, crew of 17 and power from a Diesel-electric, single propeller with 1,000 shp. 
 12 YFU US Navy Utility Boat 	180 tons. YFU 71 to YFU 82 in 1967 an d 1968. 
 LCU 1637 	a US Navy Landing Craft at 190 tons in 1970,  This ship the only one in it class, with a sea simulator platform (ASSP), and was crewed civilians from the Radio Corp. of America (RCA).
 Carquinez Ferry at 537 tons, built in	1956, later renamed Blackbeard then Noble Phoenix. State of California ran between Martinez and Benicia until 1962. A length of 169 feet, a beam of 52 feet and a depth of 13.5 feet with a diesel engine, 1,000 hp.

See also
California during World War II
Maritime history of California
 Union Iron Works
 Richmond Shipyards
Kneass Boat Works
Pacific Bridge Company

References

American Theater of World War II
1940s in California
American boat builders